Joe Island is an island of the Nares Strait, Greenland.  Administratively it belongs to the Avannaata municipality. 

Joe Island was named after Joe (Ipiirvik or Ebierbing), an Inuit guide who accompanied Charles Francis Hall in the 1871 Polaris expedition.

Geography
Joe Island lies in the Kennedy Channel at the limit of the Hall Basin. It is located about 4 km north of Cape Morton, off the northern end of the Petermann Peninsula, to the northwest of the mouth of Petermann Fjord. The waters around the island are icebound most of the year.

The island is mushroom-shaped. It has an area of 1.1 km2 and an elevation of 100 meters.

See also
List of islands of Greenland
List of islands named after people

Bibliography
George Nares Narrative of a voyage to the Polar Sea during 1875–6 in H.M. ships 'Alert' and 'Discovery'

References

External links
Fata Morgana, or superior mirage of Joe Island, off the west coast of Arctic Greenland, in Nares Strait
Uninhabited islands of Greenland